The 2013 Capital Football season was the first season under the new competition format in the Australian Capital Territory.  The competition consisted of two divisions across the ACT, created from the teams in the previous structure. The overall premier for the new structure qualified for the National Premier Leagues finals series, competing with the other state federation champions in a final knockout tournament to decide the National Premier Leagues Champion for 2013.

League Tables

2013 National Premier League ACT

The 2013 National Premier League ACT season was played over 25 rounds, from March to August 2013.

Finals

2013 ACT Capital League

The 2013 ACT Capital League was the first edition of the new Capital League as the second level domestic association football competition in the ACT. 12 teams competed, all playing each team in their pool twice and the other pool once for a total of 16 rounds. Canberra FC B withdrew during the season, leaving Pool B with only five teams.

Pool A

Pool B

Finals

2013 Capital Football Division 2

The 2013 ACT Capital Football Division 2 was the first edition of the new Capital League Division 2 as the third level domestic association football competition in the ACT. 12 teams competed, all playing each team in their pool twice and the other pool once for a total of 16 rounds.

Pool A

Pool B

Finals

2013 Women's Premier League

Finals

Cup Competitions

2013 Federation Cup

2013 was the 51st edition of the Capital Football Federation Cup. In 2013, the Federation Cup, which is open to all senior men's teams registered with Capital Football, consisted of three rounds, quarter-finals, semi-finals and a final. NPL clubs entered the tournament in the third round. The Cup ran from 6 April 2013 (first round) till 28 August 2013 (final). Tuggeranong United clinched the 2013 Cup with a 3–2 victory in extra time over Cooma Tigers. Although not originally intended, the 2013 Federation Cup became the qualifying tournament to determine the FFA Cup ACT representative for the inaugural 2014 FFA Cup after holders Tuggeranong lodged a successful official appeal, supported by the other NPL clubs, to Capital Football in early 2014.

See also

Soccer in the Australian Capital Territory
Sport in the Australian Capital Territory

References

2013 in Australian soccer